Spyridium majoranifolium is a species of flowering plant in the family Rhamnaceae and is endemic to the south of Western Australia. It grows on coastal dunes and stony hillsides in near-coastal areas in the Esperance Plains, Jarrah Forest and Warren bioregions  of southern Western Australia.

This spyridium was first formally described in 1837 by Eduard Fenzl who gave it the name Trymalium majoranifolium in Enumeratio plantarum quas in Novae Hollandiae ora austro-occidentali ad fluvium Cygnorum et in sinu Regis Georgii collegit Carolus Liber Baro de Hügel from specimens collected by Ferdinand Bauer. In 1995, Barbara Lynette Rye changed the name to Spyridium majoranifolium in the journal Nuytsia. The specific epithet (majoranifolium) means "marjoram-leaved".

References

majoranifolium
Rosales of Australia
Flora of Western Australia
Plants described in 1837
Taxa named by Eduard Fenzl